"Destination Calabria" is a song by Italian music producer Alex Gaudino with vocals by Crystal Waters. It is the first single released from his debut album My Destination. The track is a mashup, taking the instrumental from Rune RK's "Calabria" and the vocals from Gaudino's and Waters' "Destination Unknown", both originally released in 2003. It was produced with the help of Maurizio Nari and Ronnie Milani (Nari & Milani), matching the saxophone riff from "Calabria" to Waters' voice.

In 2006, "Destination Calabria" was released in Italy as a 12-inch single by Rise Records. In the United Kingdom, a CD and 12-inch single were issued on 19 March 2007 by Data Records. The song was also successful in several other countries, including Australia, Belgium, France, Ireland, Spain, and the United Kingdom.

Music video
The music video is directed by Eran "Rani" Creevy, produced by Ben Pugh for Ministry of Sound and choreographed by David Leighton. It features eight female dancers (Natasha Payne, Jessica Fox and more) in sexualized green marching band costumes, playing various instruments in a seductive manner, and dancing inside an infinity cove. In some scenes, seemingly hundreds of the dancers are seen at once, but these are simply the original eight replicated many times using digital imagery.

Waters herself does not appear in the video, but members of the marching band lip sync her lyrics at various points.

Track listings

Italian 12-inch single (2006)
A1. "Destination Calabria" (original extended mix) – 6:56
A2. "Destination Calabria" (Nari & Milani club mix) – 6:43
B1. "Destination Calabria" (Gaudino & Rooney remix) – 8:06

Italian 12-inch single (2007)
A1. "Destination Calabria" (UK extended mix) – 6:52
A2. "Destination Calabria" (Paul Emanuel remix) – 7:40
B1. "Destination Calabria" (King Unique remix) – 6:47
B2. "Destination Calabria" (Laidback Luke remix) – 7:16

UK CD single
 "Destination Calabria" (radio edit)
 "Destination Calabria" (club mix)

Dutch CD single
 "Destination Calabria" (radio edit) – 3:02
 "Destination Calabria" (Nari & Milani club mix) – 6:43
 "Destination Calabria" (Laidback Luke remix) – 7:16
 "Destination Calabria" (Drunkenmunky 2007 remake) – 6:31

Australian maxi-CD single
 "Destination Calabria" (radio edit)
 "Destination Calabria" (club mix)
 "Destination Calabria" (Paul Emanuel remix)
 "Destination Calabria" (Laidback Luke remix)
 "Destination Calabria" (Drunkenmunky 2007 remake)

Australian digital download
 "Destination Calabria" (radio edit) – 3:03
 "Destination Calabria" (King Unique remix) – 6:43
 "Destination Calabria" (Static Shokx remix) – 6:08

New Zealand digital EP
 "Destination Calabria" (radio edit) – 3:01
 "Destination Calabria" (club mix) – 6:32
 "Destination Calabria" (Laidback Luke remix) – 7:18
 "Destination Calabria" (Wharton & Lloyd remix) – 9:17

Chart performance
"Destination Calabria" entered the UK Singles Chart at No. 18 on 18 March 2007 on downloads alone and eventually peaked at No. 4. It also reached No. 1 on the UK Dance Chart, No. 3 on the Australian ARIA Singles Chart, and No. 2 on the Irish Singles Chart.

Weekly charts

Year-end charts

Certifications

Release history

References

External links
 12 inch single on Discogs.com
 CD single on Discogs.com

2006 songs
2007 singles
Alex Gaudino songs
Crystal Waters songs
Data Records singles
Mashup songs
Ministry of Sound singles
Songs written by Alex Gaudino
Songs written by Rune Reilly Kölsch
Spinnin' Records singles